Christopher Charles Lowe Jr. (born July 17, 1987) is an American professional basketball player who last played for Xion Dukes Klosterneuburg in Austria. He played college basketball at the University of Massachusetts.

High school
Chris Lowe attended Mount Vernon High School in New York, the same school that produced Ben Gordon and Gus "The Wizard" Williams. As a senior, averaged 12.9 points and 6.5 assists and 4.5 steals per game. During the Class AA New York State Public Title in 2004 with a 27-3 record, in a championship game, then junior Lowe held future NBA guard Sebastian Telfair to a season-low 14 points in a 66-52 victory.

College 
Chris Lowe was the starting point guard for the UMass Minutemen. He led the Atlantic 10 in assists as a freshman in 2005-06, and earned a spot on the league's Rookie Team.  As a junior, Lowe averaged 11.8 points and 6.3 assists a game.  The 6.3 assists per game also led the A-10.  As a senior, he was named a Preseason Atlantic 10 First Team Guard and Preseason All-Defensive Team.  He started all of the team's 30 games during his senior season, and finished the year with an average of 12.4 points and 6.4 assists per game.  Also named A-10's best passer-by The Sporting News.

Lowe left UMass as the school's all-time leader in assists, with 678 over his career, breaking Carl Smith's prior mark of 633.  He also scored 1,152 points for the school in his four seasons.

On March 5, 2008, Lowe had the sixth triple-double in UMass history (his first) with 14 points, 13 assists and 10 rebounds, in a 100-63 win over La Salle University.

Lowe graduated from UMass in May 2009.

Professional 
Lowe joined the Springfield Armor in the NBA's Developmental League, on December 11, 2009.  Ironically, he replaced Craig Austrie on the roster.  Lowe was recruited to UMass to replace Austrie, who had committed to play for UMass but then changed to UConn.  The Armor released Lowe after 10 games with the club, during which he averaged 5.0 points and 2.4 assists per game.  Lowe was then signed by the D-League's Maine Red Claws, and played in 9 games for the club, averaging 2.7 points and 2.3 assists. He was waived by Maine on January 31, 2010.

In November 2010, Lowe began playing in Lithuania for the Baltic Basketball League club Naglis-Adakris Palangos (Challenge Cup Group A).

In July 2014, he signed with BSC Raiffeisen Panthers Fürstenfeld of Austria. In July 2015, he signed with Xion Dukes Klosterneuburg, also from Austria.

References

External links
UMass Player Bio Chris Lowe
Player page on UMassHoops.com
ESPN Player Card Chris Lowe
Eurobasket.com profile
FIBA.com profile

1987 births
Living people
American expatriate basketball people in Austria
American expatriate basketball people in Lithuania
American expatriate basketball people in Slovakia
Basketball players from New York (state)
BSC Fürstenfeld Panthers players
BC Neptūnas players
Maine Red Claws players
Sportspeople from Mount Vernon, New York
Point guards
Springfield Armor players
UMass Minutemen basketball players
Xion Dukes Klosterneuburg players
American men's basketball players
Mount Vernon High School (New York) alumni